The PSA World Tour 2012 is the international squash tour organised circuit organized by the Professional Squash Association (PSA) for the 2012 squash season. The most important tournament in the series is the World Championship held in Doha in Qatar. The tour features three categories of regular events, World Series, which feature the highest prize money and the best fields, International and Challenger. The Tour is concluded by the PSA World Series Finals, the end of season championship for the top 8 rated players.

2012 Calendar

Key

World Championship

World Series
Prize money: $115,000 and more

International
Prize money: between $25,000 and $114,999

January

February

March

April

August

September

October

November

Year end world top 10 players

Retirements
Following is a list of notable players (winners of a main tour title, and/or part of the PSA World Rankings top 30 for at least one month) who announced their retirement from professional squash, became inactive, or were permanently banned from playing, during the 2012 season:

 Thierry Lincou (born 2 April 1976 in the Réunion Island, France) joined the pro tour in 1994, became the first French squash player to be ranked world no. 1 spot in 2004 and win the World Open in 2004. Keeping the spot for a whole year in 2004. He won 17 PSA World Tour titles including Cathay Pacific Hong Kong Open in 2004 and two times the Bluenose Classic. He was one of only five players to have maintained themselves in the top 10 without interruption for 10 years at the PSA World Tour. He retired in August after win the Bluenose Classic.
 Mohd Azlan Iskandar (born 1 June 1982 in Sarawak, Malaysia) joined the pro tour in 2000, reached the singles no. 10 spot in 2011. He won 13 PSA World Tour titles including Malaysian Open and the Cannon Kirk Irish Open. He retired in July after competing a last time in the Kuala Lumpur Open.
 Mohammed Abbas (born 24 December 1980 in Giza, Egypt) joined the pro tour in 1998, reached the singles no. 13 spot in April 2007. He won 4 PSA World Tour titles including Kuala Lumpur Open in 2007. He retired after losing in the first round of the Qatar World Open in December 2012.
 Davide Bianchetti (born 8 March 1977 in Brescia, Italy) joined the pro tour in 1996, reached the singles no. 24 spot in October 2004. He won 10 PSA World Tour. In 2003, he reached the quarter final of the World Open. He retired in December after competing a last time in the Prague Open.

See also
WSA World Tour 2012
PSA World Series
PSA World Rankings
PSA World Series Finals
PSA World Open

References

External links
PSA World Tour

PSA World Tour seasons
2012 in squash